Gone to the Dogs is a 1939 musical comedy vehicle starring George Wallace. It was the second of two films he made for director Ken G. Hall, the first being Let George Do It (1938).

Synopsis
George is a disaster-prone zoo attendant who accidentally discovers a substance that accelerates motion, enabling his greyhound to run faster. This attracts the interest of a gang of criminals, who kidnap George's dog and plan to substitute their own in an important dog race. George and his friends defeat the crooks and their dog wins the race.

Cast

George Wallace as George
Lois Green as Jean McAllister
John Dobbie as Henry Applegate
John Fleeting as Jimmy Alderson
Ronald Whelan as Willard
Alec Kellaway as Mad Jack
Letty Craydon as Mrs McAllister
Kathleen Esler as Irene Inchape
Howard Craven as Ted Inchape
Harold Meade as Mr Inchape
Lou Vernon as Doctor Sundermann
George Lloyd as Quinn
Harry Abdy as Hogg
Reginald Collins as Benson
Jack Settle as head keeper
Stephen Doo as Sing Lo
Hughie as Aloysius, the dog

Production
George Wallace signed with Cinesound in February 1937. Stuart F. Doyle announced that Gone to the Dogs would be his first movie for the company but he ended up making Let George Do It first.

As with all Cinesound comedies in the late 30s, uncredited work on the script was performed by Hall, Jim Bancks and Bill Maloney. Frank Coffey was Cinesound's in house story editor. The story followed a formula developed in Wallace's Ticket in Tatts: "George is given a simple labourer's job... Quite innocently is fired...  He then becomes involved in a simple wish-fulfilment device... the device is complicated by an equally simple set of stereotyped gangsters who have no motivation beyond innate greed for greater wealth, and in each situation they are foiled, usually accidentally, by George and his friends."

Filming started in January 1939 and was completed by May.

Wallace's female co-star was Lois Green, an actor with extensive stage experience with J. C. Williamson Ltd, who left Australia after filming to go work in London. The romantic male lead was an unknown amateur actor called John Fleeting, who later appeared for Hall in Come Up Smiling (1939).

The cast also included John Dobbie, Wallace's long-time stooge on stage, and Howard Craven, a former publicity writer for MGM in Sydney who had gone into acting. Hughie the dog, who played George's greyhound, was selected over 100 other applicants. Extras were drawn from Cinesound's Talent School.

A set built for the film was promoted at the time as being the largest ever built for an Australian movie at over 12,000 square feet. Some location shooting took place at Taronga Zoo.

While on location in Campbelltown, a scene was filmed where George Wallace was run over. A farmer saw this and called the police.

A highlight of the film involved a "greyhound ballet". This involved training greyhounds for two weeks so they would be used to the lights and working with ballet dancers. The opening sequence involves Wallace having an encounter with gorillas. Cinesound's special effects man J Kenyon recalled an incident with creating the costumes:
The costumes were made first of all by the furrier, but they fitted so perfectly the actors could hardly move in them, so I got to work. I had to unpick all the stitches and then redesign the costumes, allowing for more accommodation. Even then, none could cope with being enclosed in such a 'hot house,' and in the end we had to get a professional wrestler to play the part of both animals. He lost three stone while the scenes were being taken.
The wrestler was Fred Atkins. Grant Taylor auditioned for the part of the gorilla. He was unsuccessful but this led to him being cast in Dad Rudd, MP (1940).

The theme song was composed by a Viennese composer living in Sydney, Henry Krips.

Release
Gone to the Dogs had its world premiere at the Majestic Theatre, Launceston in 1939. Hall later wrote that the two films he made with Wallace "were very substantial hits". Reviews were generally positive.

References

External links
Gone to the Dogs in the Internet Movie Database
Gone to the Dogs at Australian Screen Online
Gone to the Dogs at Oz Movies
Gone to the Dogs at Peter Malone
Review of film at Variety

1939 films
Films directed by Ken G. Hall
Australian sports comedy films
Australian black-and-white films
Australian musical comedy films
1939 musical comedy films
1930s sports comedy films
1930s Australian films
1930s English-language films
Cinesound Productions films